Second Thoughts is a British comedy television programme that ran from 3 May 1991 to 14 October 1994. It was broadcast on the ITV network and made by the ITV company LWT. It was followed by a sequel, Faith in the Future. Second Thoughts followed the lives of two middle-aged divorcees, Bill MacGregor and Faith Greyshott, from very different backgrounds trying to develop a relationship, despite the pressures pulling it apart (namely Faith's two teenage children and Bill's devious ex-wife Liza, who works alongside him).

Second Thoughts was based upon the real-life relationship of the writers, husband and wife Jan Etherington and Gavin Petrie. It originally aired as a radio series on BBC Radio 4 broadcast between 1 November 1988 and 23 July 1992. The radio series consisted of four series and a Christmas special broadcast in 1992 with a total of 31 episodes. The radio scripts were used for the television series on ITV. The fifth series was the only series not to be based on the original radio scripts.

During the recording of an episode of series four, Lynda Bellingham was surprised by the This Is Your Life host Michael Aspel on set as she was to be the star of an episode of This is Your Life. Her co-star James Bolam was in on the surprise, and Lynda appeared truly shocked when Michael Aspel appeared on the set to present her with the big red book and to tell her "this is your life!" to the thundering applause of the studio audience.

Second Thoughts ended on 14 October 1994, but has since been repeated on Forces TV. The original radio series was often replayed on BBC7, and continues to be repeated on BBC7's rebranded replacement, BBC Radio 4 Extra.

Characters
Bill MacGregor (James Bolam) – An art editor of a style magazine where he works alongside his bitchy ex-wife Liza.
Faith Greyshott (Lynda Bellingham) – Faith is a freelance illustrator who occasionally does work for the style magazine Bill works for.She has two teenagers from her previous marriage, Hannah and Joe. The children and the dog often come before Bill.
Liza MacGregor  (sometimes known as Liza Ferrari) (Belinda Lang) – Bill's glamorous ex-wife, Liza is a histrionic woman with expensive tastes. Liza works for the same magazine as Bill and is constantly interfering with Bill and Faith's relationship.
Hannah Greyshott (Julia Sawalha) – Faith's teenage daughter and eldest child.
Joe Greyshott (Mark Denham) – Faith's teenage son. Joe is obsessed with football and only shows interest in girls when they like football.
Hilary (Louisa Rix in series 1; Paddy Navin in series 2 and 3) – Faith's best friend who is unlucky in love.
Richard (Geoffrey Whitehead) – Bill's boss at the magazine. Richard is married to Marjorie, but has an affair with Liza.
Marjorie (Georgina Melville)
Callum (Ian Henderson) – Bill's cousin.
Defor the Dog (Levi)

Episode guide

Series 1: 1991

Series 2: 1992

Series 3: 1992–1993

Series 4: 1993

Series 5: 1994

Radio series

Second Thoughts original started as a Radio series on BBC radio 4, between 1988 and 1991, before moving onto TV series.

Episode guide
 1st series: 3 November-22 December 1988 
 2nd Series: 31 October-19 December 1989
 3rd Series: 9 April-28 May 1991 
 4th Series: 18 June-23 July 1992 
Xmas special 25 December 1992 ('The Fight Before Christmas').

DVD releases
All five series of Second Thoughts have been released on DVD. The first series was released in June 2005, but there was a six-year gap before the second series was released on 11 July 2011. (During the gap, Network DVD was busy sorting out and planning release schedules on other TV shows.) The third series was released just under four months later on 7 November 2011, followed by the fourth series on 16 January 2012, and the fifth and final series on 5 March 2012, with a complete series set consisting of all five series together that followed.

References

External links
 .
 .
 .

1990s British sitcoms
1991 British television series debuts
1994 British television series endings
ITV sitcoms
London Weekend Television shows
Television series by ITV Studios
English-language television shows